The Borgia is a 2006 Spanish-Italian biographical film directed by Antonio Hernández. It stars Lluís Homar, Sergio Peris-Mencheta and María Valverde as, respectively, Rodrigo, Cesare and Lucrezia Borgia.

Cast

Release 
Distributed by DeAPlaneta, the film was theatrically released in Spain on 6 October 2006.

See also 
 List of Spanish films of 2006

References

External links 

2000s biographical films
2000s Spanish-language films
2006 films
Spanish biographical films
Italian biographical films
Cultural depictions of Lucrezia Borgia
Cultural depictions of Caterina Sforza
Cultural depictions of Cesare Borgia
Films set in Valencia
2000s Spanish films
2000s Italian films